Dragon and Slave is the third volume of Timothy Zahn's Dragonback series, following Dragon and Thief and Dragon and Soldier. It is a thriller, set largely on the fictional planet Brum-a-dum, and follows its protagonists' experience of slavery.

Publication history
The novel was first published in June 2005 by Starscape

Sequels
Its sequels are Dragon and Herdsman, Dragon and Judge and Dragon and Liberator.

Plot
Having determined that the various 'Brummgas' (a troll-like species reputed for unintelligence) encountered in the prior two volumes, are supplied to mercenary societies by their home planet's 'Chookoock' estate, protagonists Jack (a 14-year-old former burglar) and the dragonlike Draycos infiltrate the slave-population thereof, in hope of identifying, among the estate's clients, the mercenaries who earlier killed Draycos' shipmates. Initially accepted as a field-slave, Jack later enters the owners' house as an entertainer, where he fails to identify Draycos' enemies, but is himself arranged for sale by antagonist Gazen. At the resulting auction, Draycos (unseen except by Jack and the reader) and Jack observe an enemy soldier earlier glimpsed in Dragon and Thief, the first volume, and identify the organization to which he belongs; thus completing their objective. Thereafter Jack leads a slave-revolt, freeing approximately 30 slaves and placing them under the protection of a nearby consulate.

References

2005 American novels
American fantasy novels

Novels by Timothy Zahn
Novels about slavery
Novels set on fictional planets